Republican National Guard may refer to:
Italian  National Republican Guard
Portuguese National Republican Guard

See also
National Guard (disambiguation)
National Republican Guard (disambiguation)
Home Guard